Lawrence Grimsrud (November 10, 1871 – December  28, 1956) was an American lawyer and politician.

Born in Lower Coon Valley, Vernon County, Wisconsin, Grimsrud worked on the family farm. He went to the Breckinridge Institute in Decorah, Iowa. Grimsrud then received his bachelor's degree from St. Olaf College. He then studied law at Drake University, then at a law office in La Crosse, Wisconsin, and was admitted to the Wisconsin bar in 1901. Grimsrud lived briefly in Minot, North Dakota and then practiced law in Westby, Wisconsin. Grimsrud served on the Westby village board, as president of the village, and as village attorney. In 1911 and 1913, Grimsrud served in the Wisconsin State Assembly and was a Republican. In 1918, Grimsrud moved to Viroqua, Wisconsin. Grimsrud died in Viroqua, Wisconsin and was buried at Viroqua Cemetery in Vernon County, Wisconsin.

Notes

External links

1871 births
1956 deaths
People from Minot, North Dakota
People from Westby, Wisconsin
St. Olaf College alumni
Wisconsin lawyers
Wisconsin city council members
Mayors of places in Wisconsin
Burials in Wisconsin
American people of Norwegian descent
People from Viroqua, Wisconsin
Drake University Law School alumni
Republican Party members of the Wisconsin State Assembly